Colin Derrick Berry (born 29 January 1946) is a British radio disc jockey, presenter and newsreader, best known for his many years at BBC Radio 2.

Career

Early years
Berry began his radio career reading news on Radio Caroline in 1965. Before that he had performed administrative duties at Granada Television and Westward Television and went on to do similar for Radio Caroline. After the Marine Offences Act came into force Berry spent time with more administrative duties for the newly opened Yorkshire Television while working as a club DJ, moving on to work in record promotion, and BBC Radio Medway as a Saturday afternoon presenter. He also spent the summer of 1971 as an announcer for HTV.

Berry had a brief stint with BBC Radio 1 writing and presenting programme trails, before joining BBC Radio 2 as an announcer/presenter in 1973, where he stayed on the staff for thirty-three years, presenting Night Ride, The Late Show, Music Through Midnight, European Pop Jury, Band Parade, The Early Show, You & The Night & The Music and countless other shows and concerts. He also deputised for most of the main daytime presenters, including Terry Wogan, Jimmy Young and David Hamilton. During this lengthy period Berry presented programmes for BFBS, and also Inflight Productions for which he remains on the list of presenters.

Berry was the UK spokesman for the Eurovision Song Contest for many years, reading out the country's voting results. This was a role he held between 1977 and 2002, with the exceptions of 1980 and 1998. He was also the stand-by television commentator, in case the line of Terry Wogan was lost. This never happened, though it nearly did on one occasion, just 30 seconds before the show began.

Berry also appeared on other shows including The Generation Game, Blankety Blank and Bargain Hunt.

Freelance
After going freelance in 2006, Berry continued reading the news on Radio 2 until September 2012, when big changes occurred resulting in the majority of Radio 2 news summaries being read by journalists. His last bulletin was at 3am on 8 September 2012. Having presented late night Saturdays on BBC Three Counties Radio from 2004, during 2009 and 2010 Berry presented a weekly show for BBC Local Radio across the Eastern Counties - The Saturday Club: 6 to 9pm, playing music from the 1960s and 1970s. Until 2019, he had an occasional series for BBC Three Counties Radio - A Little Light Music, along with other music shows on or around bank holidays. He has also been heard periodically on The Vintage Top 40 Show on various BBC local stations at 5pm on Sundays.

Berry was the regular cover for Richard Spendlove's long-running music and phone-in show on BBC local radio in the east and south-east of England on Saturday nights for a few years until his final show on 29 April 2017.

He is represented by BigFish Media for his voiceover work.

References

External links

1946 births
BBC newsreaders and journalists
BBC Radio 2 presenters
Offshore radio broadcasters
Living people
People from Welwyn Garden City